The Project is a New Zealand current affairs show hosted by Jesse Mulligan, Kanoa Lloyd, and Jeremy Corbett with rotating guest panelists. It airs at 7 pm weeknights on Three.

Format 
The show's format was purchased from Roving Enterprises and is the same as that of the Australian version, The Project, which airs on Network Ten. It presents light and topical current affairs content as well as comedy from recent news stories. It is filmed and broadcast live in front of a studio audience.

Each presenter fills a different role on the programme: the anchor (Jesse Mulligan), the newsreader (Kanoa Lloyd) and the comedian (Jeremy Corbett). They are usually joined by a guest presenter who is typically a well-known New Zealander, such as a journalist, comedian or politician, or an international guest. Jaquie Brown fills that role regularly on Fridays. All the presenters introduce and voice over magazine-style current affairs stories and discuss the day's events. 

Episodes are thirty minutes, but were sixty minutes on Fridays from the show's 2017 launch until the end of 2019. The guest presenter and live audience were briefly discontinued during the COVID-19 pandemic.

Presenters

Backup presenters 

 As anchor 
 Jon Bridges
 Michael Wesley-Smith
 Wallace Chapman
 Patrick Gower
 Ryan Bridge
 Nadine Higgins
 As newsreader 
 Nadine Higgins (née Chalmers-Ross)
 Mike McRoberts
 Ali Mau
 Isobel Ewing
 Jeremy Corbett
 Kate Rodger
 Laura Tupou
 As comedian 
 Ben Hurley
 Peter Helliar
 Jeremy Elwood
 Rhys Mathewson
 Dai Henwood
 Josh Thomson
 Rose Matafeo
 Melanie Bracewell
 Urzila Carlson
 Justine Smith
 Rove McManus
 Guy Williams
 Heath Franklin (as Chopper)
 Jono Pryor
 Tony Lyall
 Paul Ego
 Jaquie Brown
 Pax Assadi

History

Season 1 (2017) 
The first television advertisement for the show was released in early February and promoted the show as "not the same old song and dance". The program launched on 20 February 2017 with hosts Jesse Mulligan, Kanoa Lloyd, and Josh Thomson, and guest host Rove McManus, and became the number 1 trend on Twitter during its timeslot. Fill-in hosts throughout the first season include Ben Hurley, Peter Helliar, Jeremy Elwood, Rhys Mathewson, and Dai Henwood for Josh Thomson, Jon Bridges, Michael Wesley-Smith and Wallace Chapman for Jesse Mulligan, and Nadine Higgins (née Chalmers-Ross) for Kanoa Lloyd. On Monday through Thursday, episodes aired for half an hour, and on Friday, for a whole hour.

On 5 June 2017, RadioLive ceased simulcasting The Project.

The season ended on 15 December 2017, having aired 212 episodes.

Season 2 (2018) 
The second season of The Project debuted on 15 January 2018, three weeks earlier than its competitor, Seven Sharp. 

On 16 March 2018, Josh Thomson left his position as panelist on The Project, although he "will continue to contribute to The Project, and will join Jesse and Kanoa on the desk regularly." His position was filled by Jeremy Corbett, who had usually been the fourth host on Monday nights.

On 18 May 2018, Francesca Avent and Toby Gilsenan got married live on The Project, with Jaquie Brown officiating, as a culmination of the show's week-long celebration of the wedding of Prince Harry and Meghan Markle.

The season ended on 14 December 2018, having aired 238 episodes.

Season 3 (2019) 
The third season of The Project debuted on 21 January 2019, with Prime Minister Jacinda Ardern's partner Clarke Gayford as the fourth host.

On 15 March, they had no fourth host or live studio audience as they covered the Christchurch mosque shootings.

On 17 April, there was no episode, because Three was airing the You Are Us/Aroha Nui concert live from Christchurch. There was also no episodes on 19 April or 22 April for Good Friday and Easter Monday.

The season ended on 13 December 2019, having aired 232 episodes.

Season 4 (2020) 
The fourth season of The Project debuted on 20 January 2020. The Friday episodes were reduced to half an hour.

On 17 February, they aired at 6:30pm due to a network outage at Newshub, which forced Three to re-air the 4:30pm bulletin at 6pm, and meant that they didn't have an autocue.

Due to the COVID-19 pandemic, the show stopped having an audience from 16 March, and from 23 March, it stopped having a rotating guest panelist, changing to a three-host format. A physically distanced studio audience returned on 18 May. A full studio audience and rotating guest panelist returned on 8 June, with Patrick Gower being the first.

On 12 August, with Auckland returning to Alert Level 3, the show stopped having an audience and reverted to the three-host format. When Auckland returned to Alert Level "2.5" on 31 August, a fourth host returned and a physically distanced audience was added.

The season ended on 11 December 2020, having aired 233 episodes.

Season 5 (2021) 
The fifth season of The Project debuted on 18 January 2021. The rotating guest panelist was removed from 15 to 17 February 2021 and again from 1 to 5 March 2021, while Auckland was in Alert Level 3.

On 27 May, Urzila Carlson was scheduled to be the guest host, but had to self-isolate before the episode began.

, 116 episodes have been aired.

Episodes

Season 1

Season 2

Season 3

Season 4

Season 5

References

2017 New Zealand television series debuts
2010s New Zealand television series
2020s New Zealand television series
English-language television shows
New Zealand comedy television series
New Zealand television news shows
New Zealand television series based on Australian television series
New Zealand television talk shows
Three (TV channel) original programming